Debra Stephenson (born 4 June 1972) is an English actress, comedian, impressionist and singer, best known for her roles as Diane Powell in Playing the Field, Shell Dockley in Bad Girls and as Frankie Baldwin in Coronation Street.

Between 2009 and 2011, she co-starred with Jon Culshaw in The Impressions Show, a comedy sketch show with impressions of top celebrities. Stephenson has voiced a number of characters for sketch shows such as Dead Ringers (2014–present) and Newzoids (2015–2016). She appeared, she appeared in the BBC daytime soap, Doctors as Charlotte Hill in March 2019.

In 2018 she was regular team captain on the panel show The Imitation Game for ITV1, opposite Rory Bremner.

Family
Stephenson is an only child. Her parents live in the East Riding of Yorkshire. She is married with two teenage children.

Career
At the age of 14, Stephenson appeared on BBC TV's Opportunity Knocks, winning her way through to the All-Winners' Final, broadcast live from the London Palladium. Around the same time she appeared on Blue Peter doing impressions.

She would later appear in other CBBC programmes such as The Friday Zone (in which she was a regular presenter) and was a backing singer on Chris Jarvis's 1997 charity single "Glasses".

In 1995 she sang vocals on musician and writer  John Robb project Sensuround. She also sang in rave band Rhythm Quest, touring rave venues.

After graduating as an actor from The Manchester Metropolitan University, Stephenson was cast in various television roles, first appearing in ITV drama Reckless, starring Francesca Annis and Robson Green. In 1998 (for three series) she became one of the main characters in Kay Mellor's comedy drama about women's football, Playing the Field. Stephenson also appeared in the last two episodes of ITV's adaptation of Catherine Cookson's A Dinner of Herbs, in which she played the adult Kate Roystan, who fell in love with the son of the woman who murdered her grandfather.

In 1999, Stephenson played the prominent role of  Shell Dockley in the ITV prison drama Bad Girls. Her performance as the psychotic Dockley earned her consecutive nominations for Best Actress at the National Television Awards in 1999 and 2000. After three years playing one of the show's most popular characters, Stephenson left in 2001, the same year she appeared on numerous TV light entertainment shows such as the Frank Skinner Show, The Alan Titchmarch Show, The Sharon Osbourne Show, Des and Mel, as well as taking part in Lily Savage's Blankety Blank; she returned to Bad Girls for five more episodes in 2003.

As well as doing stand-up comedy at venues including London's Comedy Store and The 100 Club Stephenson has played several roles as a comic actress on radio and television. These include Hosanna in the BBC Radio 4 comedy At Home with the Snails (2002), and BBC1 sketch show TV to Go in 2000 with Hugh Dennis, Martin Freeman, Mckenzie Crook and Pauline McLynn. Stephenson was also part of The Friday Night Project, interviewing the public and going undercover with disguises such as 'Debbo' and ‘Sister Mary’.

From June 2004 to December 2006, Stephenson starred in British soap opera Coronation Street playing Frankie Baldwin. She received nominations for "Best Newcomer" at various TV and soap awards shows. On 14 May 2006, producers announced that Stephenson would be leaving the soap at the end of that year. Her final scenes aired on 31 December 2006.

In 2005, Stephenson took part in Comic Relief Does Fame Academy, a singing competition involving celebrities, to raise money for charity, and finished fifth. Among her performances was a rendition of "Cry Me a River" which was called "blemishless" . Her participation on the show led to a recording contract and she released her debut album, In The Sunshine including cover versions of the songs she sang on the show.

Stephenson was a reporter for GMTV throughout 2007 as part of The Richard Arnold Show.

Debra also appeared on Lorraine weekly, presenting her 10-week bikini diet plan. This involved demonstrating recipes in the studio kitchen.

Stephenson appeared on Channel Virgin 1's immersive style documentary The Prisoner:X in December 2008. Here she was locked up for four days in a high security prison in America, where she spent a night in segregation and was treated as though she was an actual prisoner doing time in that prison.

Stephenson has performed in many pantomimes. Roles have included Aladdin, Peter Pan and Jack (Jack and the Beanstalk) at venues including the Regent Theatre in Ipswich, Nottingham Theatre Royal, Bournemouth Pavilion Theatre and Poole Lighthouse.

The Impressions Show with Culshaw and Stephenson, led by Stephenson and Jon Culshaw, began recording in August 2009. Eight episodes were commissioned by the BBC; the first aired on Saturday 31 October 2009. The show was recommissioned for a second series in 2010 and then again for a third series of six episodes which started on 26 October 2011. As of October 2011, only the first series has currently been released on to DVD.

In March 2010, Stephenson took part in Let's Dance for Sport Relief and reached the final after a rendition of Michael Jackson's "Smooth Criminal". The judges chose to put her through to the final as she had received some of the highest viewer votes. The final was live on 13 March and she performed the same routine.

She was also a contestant on the 2011 Strictly Come Dancing Christmas special. She danced the American Smooth with partner Ian Waite.

Stephenson was a guest for four episodes as Naomi Scotcher in Waterloo Road. In October 2012, Stephenson played the television cook, Fanny Cradock in Fanny and Friends on More4.

In 2015 she appeared as mentor alongside Ray Quinn in ITV's talent show Get Your Act Together. Since 2015, she has voiced a number of characters in the ITV puppet sketch show Newzoids alongside Jon Culshaw. A second series aired in 2016.

Debra has previously had guest roles on shows such as Midsomer Murders, Spooks, Where the Heart Is and Waterloo Road and has more recently made guest appearances on both Doctors and Holby City.

She also appeared in the one-off BBC comedy drama Young Hyacinth.

In 2017/18 Debra appeared alongside Diana Vickers in the stage musical Son of a Preacher Man, in a tour of UK number one theatres.

In September 2019 she appeared as Jane in Midlife Cowboy, a new musical at the Pleasance Theatre written by Tony Hawks.

Debra has for several years toured UK theatres her own one woman cabaret show “Night of 100 Voices”.

She has also performed on board cruise ships such as P&O Aurora and Ventura and also took part in the TV cook show Battlechefs, hosted by Marco Pierre White.

In 2018 Debra was regular team captain opposite Rory Bremner on ITV1 panel show The Imitation Game, hosted by Alexander Armstrong.

Debra was the voice of Melania Trump as well as Lady Margaret in the animated movie The Queen's Corgi, released in cinemas in 2019.

She also voices several characters in the ongoing CBBC animated series Scream Street.

In December 2020, Debra voiced several characters on Spitting Image for the Britbox streaming service.

Also in 2020 Debra was the actress behind the deepfake version of the Queen's Alternative Christmas Message on Christmas Day on Channel 4.

Personal life

Stephenson attended South Hunsley School in Melton, East Riding of Yorkshire, from the age of 11, and during these years she appeared in a number of national TV talent shows doing impressions. In 1996, Stephenson graduated in drama from the Manchester Metropolitan School of Theatre. She married builder James Duffield in June 1999, and they have two children; Max, born in November 2002 and Zoe born in January 2007.

Filmography
Television

Additional credits
 Coronation Street: Pantomime (2005) – Cinderella
 The Prisoner:X (2008) – Herself, contestant
 Davina McCall: A Comedy Roast (2010) – Davina McCall 
 Comic Relief: The Million Pound Drop (2011) – Davina McCall 
 Tipping Point: Lucky Stars (2013) – Herself, contestant 
 Big Star's Little Star (2016) – Herself, contestant
 Pointless Celebrities (2021) – Herself, contestant

References

External links

MMU Alumni website

1972 births
Alumni of Manchester Metropolitan University
Comedians from Yorkshire
English television actresses
English radio actresses
English soap opera actresses
English stage actresses
English voice actresses
English women comedians
English impressionists (entertainers)
Living people
Actresses from Kingston upon Hull
British expatriate actresses in the United States
20th-century English comedians
21st-century English comedians
20th-century English women
20th-century English people
21st-century English women